Undercover Teacher is a 2005 documentary in the Dispatches series for Channel 4, in which Alex Dolan, a journalist and science teacher, went undercover for six months as a supply teacher in British schools. Undercover Teacher was intended to expose the poor behaviour of children in some areas of the secondary education system by secretly filming classes.

Dolan was suspended from teaching for one year by the General Teaching Council because she 'breached student trust'. The decision has received criticism from both teachers and commentators.

See also
 Ofsted

References

External links

Dispatches (TV programme)
British high school television series
School and classroom behaviour
Teaching in the United Kingdom
Undercover journalists
2005 documentary films